The IND Rockaway Line is a rapid transit line of the IND Division of the New York City Subway, operating in Queens. It branches from the IND Fulton Street Line at Rockaway Boulevard, extending over the Jamaica Bay, into the Rockaways. The  train serves the line on the Far Rockaway–Mott Avenue branch and north of Hammels Wye. The Rockaway Park Shuttle runs between Broad Channel and Rockaway Park–Beach 116th Street. Five rush hour A trains provide service between Rockaway Park and Manhattan in the peak direction.

The line was built in 1880 as the New York, Woodhaven and Rockaway Railroad. Incorporated in 1877, the line was built to better serve the beach resorts in the Rockaways, cutting travel times by 30 minutes over the existing South Side Railroad route. Long Island Rail Road (LIRR) trains began using the branch that year by operating over its Montauk Division. The railroad was sold to the LIRR in 1887, and trains using the branch began serving Far Rockaway via a new connection to the old Far Rockaway Branch. The line south of Woodhaven Junction was electrified in 1905. The wooden trestle through Jamaica Bay was subjected to numerous fires, which damaged it. A fire on May 7, 1950, cut service on the middle of the line, but as the LIRR was bankrupt, it did not seek to restore service on the line. Service to Far Rockaway and Rockaway Park ran through Valley Stream, while service on the Rockaway Beach Branch terminated at Hamilton Beach.

The line was then purchased by the New York City Board of Transportation in 1952, and the line south of Ozone Park was taken out of service in June 1955 to allow for the line's conversion to subway service. On June 26, 1956, the line opened for subway service. A connection was built between to the IND Fulton Street Line at Liberty Avenue using the old Fulton Street Elevated line to allow for its use by the subway, and the line then became the IND Rockaway Line.

Extent and service 
The following services use part or all of the IND Rockaway Line:

The north end of the Rockaway Line is a junction with the IND Fulton Street Line just east of Rockaway Boulevard. The line starts out as tracks F3 and F4 and descend from an elevated structure to the surface. Then the right-of-way widens to be four tracks wide. Trains in service going south then diverge from F3, and go onto F1. Trains coming from the Rockaways merge from track F2 onto track F4. South of this point, track F4 is out of service, and track F3 can only be used by work trains as it is de-energized. The line then continues as a four track line, and south of Howard Beach, the tracks merge into two tracks. The line then passes over Jamaica Bay just to the east of Cross Bay Boulevard, on its own private right-of-way. Then the line passes over the North Channel Swing Bridge. The crossing across Jamaica Bay between Howard Beach and Broad Channel is the longest distance between any two adjacent stations in the entire New York City Subway system.

In 1997 to 1999, outer tracks were installed to the north of Broad Channel for between $5 million and $10 million. The track to the east of the original tracks, track F6, is used for reversing trains on the Rockaway Park shuttle, and is approximately as long as a standard full length train. This track allows the shuttle to turn around significantly faster than it had been able to do before, when it was forced to relay at Howard Beach–JFK Airport or Euclid Avenue. South of the Broad Channel station is a fixed span leading to the small Subway Island, followed by the Beach Channel Drawbridge, which does open regularly and can cause delays to service when it is open for marine traffic.

South of the drawbridge is Hammels Wye, a three-legged junction with the Rockaway Park branch, and the Far Rockaway branch. The tracks from each branch connect to the tracks north of the wye with flying junctions. The Rockaway Park Branch turns to the west, and the Far Rockaway Branch turns to the east. The third leg of the wye is a single track that connects the two branches together. This single track, track F6, is not currently used in revenue service. However, it was used as part of the Round Robin service that operated mostly during late nights between 1958 and 1988. It was also used for temporary H service after Hurricane Sandy.

The Rockaway Park Branch, tracks F3 and F4, goes west via an elevated structure over the Rockaway Freeway before terminating at Rockaway Park–Beach 116th Street. Directly to the north of the station is a seven-track storage yard named Rockaway Park Yard. This yard stores the trains for the Rockaway Park Shuttle. To the south of the station is a single storage track. The Far Rockaway Branch, tracks F3A and F4A, goes east over the Rockaway Freeway as an elevated and terminates at a two track terminal at Far Rockaway–Mott Avenue.

History

Original railroad use

Most of the Rockaway Line dates back to the 1880s when it was operated as the New York, Woodhaven and Rockaway Railroad; the Far Rockaway station had been in operation since 1869 as part of the South Side Railroad of Long Island. In 1892, the line first saw service by the Long Island Rail Road from its Atlantic Branch. In the late 1890s, the Brooklyn Elevated Railway (later the Brooklyn Rapid Transit Company) received permission to operate elevated trains from Brooklyn on the line for beach access. The city soon began eyeing the line as popularity soared. Additionally, the Ocean Electric Railway used part of the line as a connection between the Far Rockaway and Rockaway Beach Branches.

Plans for the New York City Subway to take over the Long Island Rail Road (LIRR)'s Rockaway branches were put forth as early as 1932.

The Long Island Rail Road's wooden trestle over Jamaica Bay often caught fire. A fire that started at 3:30 on a December night damaged 1,300 feet of the trestle. Service could not be resumed for several days because of a lack of available materials. Therefore, the railroad asked Green Bus Lines to provide service for passengers stranded at Broad Channel and The Raunt. Another took place at The Raunt on December 15, 1948, delaying trains between nine and nineteen minutes during the morning rush hour.  of the trestle was destroyed during a July 4, 1949, fire, and morning rush hour service was delayed the following day. The worst fire, the one that sealed the fate of the line, took place on May 7, 1950. The fire burned all night and destroyed  of the trestle between The Raunt and Broad Channel stations, and the estimated cost to repair it was $1 million. As a result, the LIRR deemed the line useless, and instead of repairing it, the LIRR decided to abandon the line in favor of their "land route" to Far Rockaway via Valley Stream in Nassau County.

Subway conversion
When the railroad made it clear that it was not planning to rebuild the line, the city bought the line on June 11, 1952, for $8.5 million. The LIRR needed the money for its big safety program, which cost $6 million. The New York City Board of Transportation, operators of the subway system, started preparing contracts for the reconstruction of the line right after the sale went through. In total, $47.5 million was spent to rebuild the line and to convert it for subway use, something they were planning to do as far back as the late 1920s. As part of the construction to convert the line to subway use, two new steel swing bridges were built to cross the North and South Channels, and two artificial islands were built using sand from Jamaica Bay to provide a roadbed for the subway trestle.

Work was completed right before the 1956 summer season, but the power supply was inadequate. Because of a strike, the delivery of substation equipment was delayed. Trains operated slowly across Jamaica Bay in order to conserve power. The newer R10s were intended to operate over the line, but because they required more power than the Arnines, the Arnines operated on the line. The line was incorporated into the Independent Subway System (IND) and connected to the IND Fulton Street Line. On June 28, 1956, service on the line began between Euclid Avenue and Rockaway Park at 6:38 PM and between Euclid Avenue and Wavecrest at 6:48 PM. Once the slow order was removed, the travel time from Euclid Avenue to Rockaway Park decreased from 40 to 28 minutes, and the travel time from Euclid Avenue to Wavecrest decreased from 44 to 32 minutes.

In September 1956, the New York City Transit Authority announced that the Rockaway revenues were disappointing, as $15,000 was expected to be made every day during the summer, while only $7,000 was made. As a result, there was a $750,000 deficit. On January 27, 1957, as a result of low ridership, service was reduced from running on eight minute headways to Broad Channel to twelve minute headways. Since service alternated between Rockaway Park and Wavecrest, stations had a train every 24 minutes. The line was built to handle 100,000 daily passengers but was only carrying 6,000. A new station at Far Rockaway–Mott Avenue opened on January 16, 1958, completing the Rockaway Line. The completion of the new terminal was delayed due to the slow delivery of steel.

Later years
The line charged a double fare south of Howard Beach which entailed the deposit of two tokens for those entering along the line or one token on exit for those arriving from other parts of the system. Passengers traveling only within the double-fare zone would request a special "refund ticket", entitling them to a refund upon exiting the system, either in cash or a token. The unpopular double fare was abolished on September 1, 1975, though it coincided with a system-wide fare increase, as well as an increase in tolls on the Marine Parkway–Gil Hodges Memorial Bridge and Cross Bay Veterans Memorial Bridge to the Rockaways.

A significant service improvement on the Rockaway Line took effect in 1993, when direct late-night service between Far Rockaway (but not Rockaway Park) and Brooklyn and Manhattan began; previously, only shuttle or Round Robin service was provided during these hours, with a transfer at Euclid Avenue (the Rockaway Park branch remains a shuttle at all times, with a transfer at Broad Channel, although additional direct rush hour service is provided by a limited number of A trains).

The segment of the line between Howard Beach and the Rockaway Peninsula suffered serious damage during Hurricane Sandy and was out of service for several months. On November 20, 2012, a free shuttle designated as H replaced the Rockaway portion of the A service between Far Rockaway–Mott Avenue and Beach 90th Street via the Hammels Wye. On May 30, 2013, full service was restored. In 2018, a two-phase program of flood mitigation work along the Hammels Wye required further service disruptions. The first phase, from April 9 to May 18, suspended rush-hour A trips to Rockaway Park. The second phase, from July 2 to September 3, diverted all Far Rockaway A trips to Rockaway Park. In both phases, the shuttle ran from Rockaway Park to Far Rockaway.

During weekends between Memorial Day and Labor Day in 2016 and 2017, weekend service on the Rockaway Park Shuttle was extended from Broad Channel to Rockaway Boulevard to allow passengers on both Lefferts Boulevard and Far Rockaway-bound A trains to transfer to the shuttle and shuttle passengers to transfer to more frequent Manhattan-bound A service at Rockaway Boulevard. The trains were also lengthened to eight cars instead of the usual four. Since then, the seasonal extension has occurred on an annual basis.

Station listing

Footnotes

References

External links

IND Rockaway Line (NYC Subway.org)

New York City Subway lines
Railroad lines in Rockaway, Queens
Rockaway, Queens
Independent Subway System
Railway lines opened in 1956